Kingstown is the capital, chief port, and main commercial centre of Saint Vincent and the Grenadines. With a population of 12,909 (2012), Kingstown is the most populous settlement in the country. It is the island's agricultural industry centre and a port of entry for tourists. The city lies within the parish of Saint George in the south-west corner of Saint Vincent.

History

The modern capital, Kingstown, was founded by French settlers shortly after 1722, although Saint Vincent had 196 years of British rule before its independence.

The botanical garden, conceived in 1765, is one of the oldest in the Western hemisphere. William Bligh, made famous from the Mutiny on the Bounty, brought seed of the breadfruit tree here for planting, .

Geography
The town is surrounded by steep hills. Secondary education is provided by the Thomas Saunders Secondary School, Boys Grammar School, Girls High School, Bishop College, St Martain, and St Josephs Convent School at Richmond Hill.

Transportation
The city is served by Argyle International Airport, which has commercial passenger services to the United States, Canada and, soon, to the United Kingdom.

Sights
Botanic Gardens St. Vincent: Located on the northern outskirts of Kingstown are the Botanical Gardens. Kingstown is overlooked by Fort Charlotte on the north side of town.
The St. George's Cathedral
The Cruise Ship Berth

See also
Saint George Parish

References

External links
Local history

 
Capitals in the Caribbean
Populated places established in 1722
Populated places in Saint Vincent and the Grenadines
1722 establishments in North America
1722 establishments in the French colonial empire